Patricia Frances Carrick (born 27 September 1941) is a New Zealand former cricketer and umpire. She played as a right-arm medium bowler. She appeared in seven Test matches and three One Day Internationals for New Zealand between 1969 and 1978.  Her best bowling performance came in 1972, when she claimed 6/29 against Australia. She played domestic cricket for Canterbury and North Shore. In 1988, she became the first woman to umpire a men's first-class match.

References

External links
 
 

1941 births
Living people
Cricketers from Dunedin
New Zealand women cricketers
New Zealand women Test cricketers
New Zealand women One Day International cricketers
New Zealand cricket umpires
Women cricket umpires
Canterbury Magicians cricketers
North Shore women cricketers